The Women's double trap took place on 27 July 2014 at the Barry Buddon Shooting Centre. There was a qualification in which the top 8 athletes qualified for the finals.

Results

References

External links
Schedule of events at 2014 Commonwealth games-Glasgow 

Shooting at the 2014 Commonwealth Games
Common